Victor C. Strasburger is an American pediatrician, an adolescent medicine expert, Distinguished Professor of Pediatrics emeritus and the Founding Chief of the Division of Adolescent Medicine at the University of New Mexico School of Medicine.  He is an international expert on the effects of media on children and adolescents and has authored many of the American Academy of Pediatrics' policy statements on children and media.

Education
Strasburger graduated from the Baltimore City College (high school) in Baltimore, Maryland in 1967 where he was the editor of the high school's year book.  He attended Yale University, summa cum laude, Phi Beta Kappa, where he studied fiction writing with Robert Penn Warren, and from Harvard Medical School.  He trained at the Children's Hospital in Seattle, St. Mary's Hospital Medical School in London, and the Boston Children's Hospital.

Professional life
Strasburger has authored 14 books and nearly 200 chapters, and original articles in the pediatric literature.  He is the author of Adolescent Medicine: A Practical Guide, 2nd edition, 1998, Lippincott-Williams & Wilkins.  The latest edition of the Adolescent Medicine textbook was published in 2006.  He is also the author of Adolescents and The Media: Medical and Psychological Impact, 1995, Sage. His latest media textbook, Children, Adolescents, and the Media (Sage, 2009) is in its second edition and is used in undergraduate and graduate communications and public health courses around the country.  A third edition was published in 2014 and is used in college communications courses around the country. In his work with the American Academy of Pediatrics, Dr. Strasburger has authored or co-authored many of their position statements regarding children, adolescents, and the media. His book "The Death of Childhood" will be published by St. Martin's Press in 2018.

He has also appeared on Oprah, The Today Show, CBS This Morning, has been featured several times in Newsweek, and has been heard numerous times on NPR (National Public Radio) and in local media. His op-ed columns on children and adolescents are featured in Liberal Opinion Weekly.  In 2000, Dr. Strasburger was honored by the American Academy of Pediatrics with the Adele Delenbaugh Hofmann Award, for outstanding lifetime achievement in Adolescent Medicine, and was the first recipient of the Holroyd-Sherry Award, given for media Advocacy work.  In 2006, he was awarded the Society for Adolescent Medicine's Visiting Professorship and lectured at the Sydney Children's Hospital in Australia.  In 2010, he was a Visiting Professor at the University of Otago Medical School in Dunedin, New Zealand.  In 2012, Dr. Strasburger was named a Distinguished Professor at the University of New Mexico -- the highest honor the University bestows on its faculty.  He was awarded a Fulbright Fellowship in 2013. Dr. Strasburger has lectured in 47 of 50 states and on 5 continents.  Dr. Strasburger's 1st novel, Rounding Third & Heading Home, was published in 1974 by St. Martin's Press when he was a senior in medical school.

Related studies
TEXTBOOK:  
 Strasburger VC, Wilson BJ, Jordan AB.  CHILDREN, ADOLESCENTS, AND THE MEDIA, 3rd edition.  Thousand Oaks, CA: Sage, third edition, 2014.
JOURNAL ARTICLES:
 Hogan MJ, Strasburger VC.  Eating disorders and the media. Adolescent Medicine: State of the Art Reviews 2018.
 Strasburger VC.  The death of childhood.  The Psychoanalytic Study of the Child 2017.
 Strasburger VC.  Should babies be viewing screens? The answer is surprisingly complicated.  Acta Paediatrica 2015; 104:967-968.
 Strasburger VC.  Media Matter: But "old" media may matter more than "new" media.  Adolescent Medicine: State of the Art Reviews 2014; 25:643-669.
 Strasburger VC, Donnerstein E, Bushman BJ.  Why don’t people believe that media affect children and adolescents?  Pediatr 2014; 133(4):571-574.
 Strasburger VC (lead author), Hogan M, and Council on Communications and Media. Policy statement: Children, adolescents, and the media.  Pediatr 2013; 132:1-4.
 Strasburger VC (lead author), Robinson T, and AAP Council on Communications and Media: Policy statement: Children, obesity, and the media.  2011; Pediatr 128(7): 201-208.
 Strasburger VC (Ed.).  Children, adolescents, and the media.  Pediatric Clinics of North America 2012; volume 59, number 3.
 Strasburger VC, Jordan AB, Donnerstein E.  Health effects of media on children and adolescents.  Pediatrics 2010; 125:756-767.

References

External links
 

1949 births
Living people
Physicians from Baltimore
Harvard Medical School alumni
Yale University alumni
Baltimore City College alumni
American pediatricians